Corbulidae is a family of very small saltwater clams, marine bivalve molluscs in the order Myida.

Genera and species
Genera and species in the family Corbulidae include:
 Anisocorbula Iredale, 1930
 Apachecorbula Olivera, 2014
 Apachecorbula muriatica Olivera, 2014
 Caestocorbula Vincent, 1910
 Caryocorbula Bruguiere, 1792 
 Caryocorbula porcella (Dall, 1916)    
 Corbula Bruguiere, 1797
 Corbula alabamiensis Lea, 1833    
 Corbula barrattiana C. B. Adams, 1852   
 Corbula bicarinata (Sowerby, 1833)
 Corbula biradiata (Sowerby, 1833)
 Corbula caribaea
 Corbula chittyana C. B. Adams, 1852
 Corbula contracta Say, 1822
 Corbula cubaniana d'Orbigny, 1842
 Corbula cymella Dall, 1881
 Corbula dietziana C. B. Adams, 1852
 Corbula kelseyi Dall, 1916
 Corbula krebsiana C. B. Adams, 1852
 Corbula luteola Carpenter, 1864
 Corbula nasuta Sowerby, 1833
 Corbula nuciformis Sowerby, 1833
 Corbula porcella Dall, 1916
 Corbula sulcata
 Corbula swiftiana C. B. Adams, 1852
 Corbula zelandica Quoy and Gaimard, 1835
 Cuneocorbula Cossmann, 1886
 Erodona Bosc, 1801
 Hexacorbula Olsson, 1932
 Juliacorbula Olsson and Harbison, 1953
Juliacorbula cubaniana (d'Orbigny, 1842)   
Juliacorbula luteola (Carpenter, 1864)
 Lentidium de Cristofori & Jan, 1832
 Panamicorbula Pilsbry, 1932
 Potamocorbula Habe, 1955
 Potamocorbula amurensis (Schrenck, 1861)
 Tenuicorbula Olsson, 1932
 Varicorbula Grant and Gale, 1931
 Varicorbula gibba (Olivi, 1792)
 Varicorbula operculata (Philippi, 1848)

References 

 
 Powell A. W. B., New Zealand Mollusca, William Collins Publishers Ltd, Auckland, New Zealand 1979 

 
Bivalve families
Taxa named by Jean-Baptiste Lamarck